The 2010–11 season was the 119th season in Liverpool Football Club's existence, and their 49th consecutive year in the top flight of English football. Liverpool were sponsored by Standard Chartered Bank, after their deal with long-running sponsors Carlsberg finished after 18 years of sponsorship. Pre-season saw a change of manager for Liverpool, with Rafael Benítez leaving the club by mutual consent on 3 June 2010.

On 1 July 2010, Roy Hodgson was officially announced as new manager.

On 22 September 2010, Liverpool exited the League Cup, going out at Anfield to Northampton Town of League Two on penalties after a 2–2 draw. They also exited the FA Cup losing 1–0 to Manchester United at Old Trafford in the third round. In the last competition in which they were active in, the UEFA Europa League, they were knocked out in the Round of 16 by Portuguese side Braga, losing 1–0 on aggregate.

On 8 January 2011, Liverpool announced that Hodgson had left the club by mutual consent, and Kenny Dalglish was appointed as manager until the end of the season.

Under Dalglish, the squads' fortunes improved, taking popular wins against top sides Chelsea and Manchester United, and the resurgence saw Liverpool rise up to fifth in May. Despite their resurgence Liverpool eventually finished sixth in the Premier League, having failed to qualify for the Europa League.

The season also saw Liverpool's record purchase and departure, as Fernando Torres left for Chelsea, being replaced by Newcastle United's target man Andy Carroll. Liverpool received £50 million for Torres, and paid £35 million for Carroll's services. Both transfers occurred during a busy transfer deadline day on 31 January, where Liverpool also broke its previous transfer record, paying £22.5 million for Luis Suárez.

During the season, Jon Flanagan and Jonjo Shelvey both made their top flight debuts.

Pre-season

On 1 July, Liverpool announced that their fixtures for pre-season would start in Austria against Al-Hilal on 17 July. The game, however, was cancelled due to heavy rainfall days before the match, which left the pitch in unplayable conditions. Liverpool continued with their pre-season preparations with a 0–0 draw with Grasshoppers on 21 July and a 1–0 defeat at the hands of 1. FC Kaiserslautern on 24 July thanks to a first half goal from Iliyan Mitsanski. Liverpool completed their pre-season programme with a 1–0 defeat to their 1977 European Cup Final opponents Borussia Mönchengladbach on 1 August. Karim Matmour's early goal meant that Liverpool completed their pre-season without victory.

Season review
(For match reports, see matches section)

August
Liverpool started their season with a pair of wins against Macedonian side Rabotnički on 29 July. In front of a largely empty stadium, the side won their first competitive fixture under Roy Hodgson, 2–0, following a double salvo from David N'Gog. In the return leg, Steven Gerrard scored from the penalty spot and N'Gog scored another to make it 2–0.

On 15 August, Liverpool entertained title contenders Arsenal at Anfield. The away side had the lion's share of the possession, and looked to be well on their way to gaining control of the fixture, when Joe Cole got sent off on his Liverpool Premier League debut for a late tackle on Laurent Koscielny. In the second half, want-away star midfielder Javier Mascherano set up N'Gog, who made a blistering run, before firing the ball into the back of the net. At the end of the game, the one-man deficit took its toll, and despite several spectacular saves from Pepe Reina, he eventually fumbled in an equaliser in a rare mistake from the Spanish international. Koscielny then was sent off for receiving a second yellow, before Gerrard fired a stoppage-time free kick just inches wide. Fernando Torres returned from injury and was greeted with a standing ovation while coming on.

On the Thursday that followed, Trabzonspor travelled to Anfield for the playoff round of the UEFA Europa League. A less-than-convincing first half-display from Liverpool turned into a sudden success, as Cole assisted Ryan Babel, who made no mistake with the finish. Cole then had the chance to score from the spot in the second half but blew it, the shot sent straight at the goalkeeper. Cole later admitted it was his first ever penalty kick as a professional. Christian Poulsen made his debut for the club, the Danish international being signed from Juventus for £4.5 million. At the same time, Italian playmaker Alberto Aquilani went in the other direction, in his case on loan with a public buyout clause.

On 23 August, Liverpool travelled to Eastlands to face Manchester City. Prior to the match, Mascherano handed in a transfer request and was dropped from the squad. Just days afterwards, he was presented at Barcelona. In the wake of the Mascherano saga, Liverpool struggled against Manchester City, who won 3–0, a score that could have been even higher. The goals were scored by Gareth Barry and Carlos Tevez, two former Liverpool transfer targets.

The poor season start looked to go from bad to worse as Trabzonspor scored the opener in the return leg thanks to Teófilo Gutiérrez, but thanks to a late own goal and a strike from Dirk Kuyt, Liverpool managed to just scrape through to the group stage.

On the Sunday, Liverpool capped the week off with a second win, narrowly defeating West Bromwich Albion, who surprisingly dominated the possession in the first half. Liverpool got out of jail thanks to a moment of genius from Kuyt and Torres, Kuyt playing in a nice cross which Torres rifled into the corner for the winning goal. In spite of the victory, the performance was criticised by the fans, not content with the way Hodgson set up his tactics. The response was the signing of Raul Meireles for half of the money received for Mascherano. The Portuguese international made his first foreign foray, following four Primeira Liga titles with Porto. On deadline day, Liverpool landed Paul Konchesky from Fulham.

September
In September, Liverpool struggled and recorded a winless month in Premier League matches. On 12 September, the away match against Birmingham City ended goalless, with Pepe Reina named Man of the Match following several key saves in a match where Birmingham had the upper hand. Liverpool could have won, however, as Gerrard had a penalty claim waved away in the first half.

Four days later, the side started the group stage phase of the Europa League with a comfortable victory against Steaua București at Anfield. Inside the first minute, Joe Cole took advantage of a defensive slip to score the opening goal. Despite Steaua drawing level within a quarter of an hour, Liverpool cruised to victory in the second half, with N'Gog scoring twice, including his first ever penalty for the club. Lucas also scored his first of the season.

The following Sunday (19 September) was the first North West derby of the season, with Liverpool travelling to Old Trafford to face Manchester United. Two goals from Dimitar Berbatov, including a bicycle kick, saw United go into a 2–0 cushion with half an hour left, when Fernando Torres won a penalty, being pulled down by Nemanja Vidić. With Gerrard scoring from the spot, Liverpool's hopes were reinvigorated, and when Torres was pulled down outside the box, Gerrard took the free kick with great precision, drawing Liverpool level, kissing the TV camera in celebration. The Liverpool joy was short-lived, as Berbatov scored his third goal from a header less than ten minutes from time. This meant Liverpool had only five points from five games, but with two home matches against unfancied sides coming up next.

In mid-week, Liverpool lost to Northampton Town in the League Cup at Anfield. It was the first time ever Liverpool had lost to a fourth-tier team, and the team was heavily criticised by the fans following the display from what essentially was the second XI. The loss was on penalty kicks, following 1–1 at full-time and 2–2 after extra time. Following N'Gog's late equaliser, Liverpool were lucky to scrape through to the shootout, where N'Gog missed his penalty and the side went out in humiliating fashion.

As courtroom battles over the right to sell the club to new investors intensified, Liverpool at least got a gift against Sunderland at home, as a brief touch on the ball by a Sunderland player was deemed enough for referee Stuart Atwell to let the play go on. Torres snapped up the ball and assisted Dirk Kuyt for a controversial goal. Atwell was not awarded with any more Premier League matches for the rest of the calendar year as a result of the goal. Sunderland turned the deficit thanks to a brace from Darren Bent, one of them from the penalty spot. Liverpool was spared the embarrassment of a third consecutive defeat thanks to a header from Gerrard following Torres' second assist of the afternoon. Controversially, Gerrard and Torres celebrated the goal on separate locations, sparking further rumours of differences between the two. A few days later, Liverpool claimed a clean sheet and a point away from home against Utrecht in the Europa League.

At the end of the month, the prospect of the club going into administration was dismissed, and even if the Royal Bank of Scotland had taken over the shares, the side would not be docked the nine points as stipulated by the Premier League.

October
The crisis continued with a shock defeat to Blackpool, where Fernando Torres limped off with a groin injury in the first half. One penalty kick and a defensive mistake caused a 0–2 deficit at the interval, and in spite of Sotirios Kyrgiakos header, and a big chance for Joe Cole a minute later, the pressure faded, and Blackpool had no problems holding on. The defeat left Liverpool in the relegation zone.

The imminent takeover looked to stall, in spite of Fenway Sports Group agreeing a fee with chairman Martin Broughton, who along with Christian Purslow and Ian Ayre had a majority in Kop Holdings, the group in charge of selling the club, where co-owners Tom Hicks and George Gillett also held seats. Hicks and Gillett took the other board members to court, and on the Friday prior to the Merseyside derby, the High Court in London, declared that the process was against British law, and that the juridical process in Texas was not going to stop the affair taking place. New owner John W. Henry immediately travelled to Liverpool, watching the derby in attendance, being joined by future chairman Tom Werner.

The derby itself saw Liverpool sink deeper into the relegation mire, with Mikel Arteta and Tim Cahill scoring Everton's goals. Following the defeat, Hodgson praised the performance in the second half, which led to demands of his resignation from prominent supporter groups. Henry and FSG gave Hodgson a vote of confidence, in spite of fan demands of Kenny Dalglish to be appointed in a clean slate following the shift of ownership.

An under-pressure manager went to Naples to face Napoli, with a B-spec side. Napoli was fighting in the top of Serie A. In spite of Liverpool being tipped by fans and media alike to lose heavily, a goalless draw was eventually a fair result. Three days later, the side also turned a corner, by winning against Blackburn Rovers at Anfield. It was not quite enough to escape the relegation zone, but the performance was relatively convincing, and Torres's winner came as an immediate response to an own goal from Jamie Carragher that took Blackburn right into the match.

October ended with Hodgson's only domestic away victory with Liverpool, when the side scored a late winner at Bolton Wanderers. The match did not provide much spark until a flick with the heel from Torres put Maxi Rodríguez through five minutes from time, and the Argentine blasted the ball in with a toe-hit. In the same match, Cole got injured and was set to miss out on a whole month. The most important effect of the two-match streak was that it meant Liverpool left the relegation zone for good, albeit they were never in a safe distance from it until 15 matches later.

November
Liverpool continued their winning streak into November, with what was likely their best performance under Hodgson in a 2–0 win over Chelsea at Anfield, courtesy of two Fernando Torres who scored both goals for Liverpool. One being a well taken finish, the other a sublime piece of skill which saw him curl the ball past the helpless Petr Čech. Despite coming under serious pressure from Chelsea in the second half, Liverpool held out for a shock win. Some say that this defeat for Chelsea sparked their dreadful mid-season form which cost them the title.

However, the recovery was halted somewhat after a surprise 1–1 draw against Wigan Athletic at the DW Stadium just a few days later. Torres was again on the score sheet with a well taken opener, before Charles N'Zogbia equalised for the Latics.

There would be further frustration for the Reds on the road, after a dismal performance and a deserved 2–0 loss to Stoke City on a Saturday evening. Liverpool recovered from the defeat though, with a deserved 3–0 victory against West Ham United at Anfield thanks to three first-half goals from Glen Johnson, a penalty from Dirk Kuyt and header by Maxi Rodríguez.

Liverpool ended the month in disappointing fashion. Despite leading Tottenham Hotspur 1–0 at half time, thanks to a rare goal from Martin Škrtel, Liverpool collapsed in the second half and lost thanks to an injury time winner through Aaron Lennon.

Liverpool played only one Europa League game in this month. A 3–1 win over Napoli was not as easy as it looks on paper. Liverpool went into half time losing 1–0, but Steven Gerrard rescued his team in the second half with an excellent hat trick. A penalty, and a superb chip over the Napoli goalkeeper, as well as capitalizing on a dreadful error by former Liverpool player Andrea Dossena guided Liverpool to three points in their group.

December
Liverpool stormed to their fourth consecutive home victory, a 3–0 Monday night win against Aston Villa via first half goals from David N'Gog and Ryan Babel. (This would be Babel's last goal for the club.) Maxi Rodríguez added a third in the second half after an excellent Liverpool counter-attack. Gérard Houllier claimed afterwards that he "didn't mind" losing to Liverpool, prompting a furious response from Villa fans. On another Saturday evening game, Liverpool were torn apart by Newcastle United, falling 3–1 at St James' Park. Dirk Kuyt managed to draw the Reds level after Kevin Nolan had fired Newcastle in front, but Joey Barton put the Geordies in front.

Liverpool played only three games in December after the scheduled game at Bloomfield Road against Blackpool was canceled. Liverpool ended the month with the visit of Wolverhampton Wanderers to Anfield, although Liverpool had lost their last game, fans were reasonably confident of a good result in this game. Raul Meireles should have put Liverpool in front after nine minutes when presented with a one-on-one opportunity after a quick free kick from Fernando Torres, as this proved to be Liverpool's best chance of the night. Wolves gradually grew into the game and restricted Liverpool to long, and hopeful hoofs from Pepe Reina to give them a chance. Stephen Ward deservedly put Wolves in front after an hour and Liverpool fans visibly became more distressed. Chants of "Dalglish" grew louder, and ironic chants of "Hodgson for England" (in reference to Roy being linked with the position after England's disastrous 2010 FIFA World Cup campaign) were echoing round the stadium. Some home fans even joined in the away supports chants of "You're getting sacked in the morning" and booed when David N'Gog was substituted for Ryan Babel, despite the Frenchman being Liverpool's best player on the night. As well as cheering ironically when Paul Konchesky was substituted for Fábio Aurélio, the fans booed at the final whistle and the contempt for Hodgson was stronger than ever.

Liverpool drew both of their December Europa League games, a 1–1 away draw against Steaua and a 0–0 draw against Utrecht at Anfield, enough for Liverpool's progression to the competition's knockout stages.

January

January began in dramatic fashion for Liverpool. On the traditional New Year's Day fixture, they fell behind at home to Bolton in the 43rd minute thanks to a Kevin Davies goal. An unsurprisingly, nowhere near full Anfield, rallied and got their rewards through a 49th-minute goal by Fernando Torres. Liverpool secured a league double over Bolton, and again scored late against them, with Joe Cole getting on the score sheet for the first time in his Liverpool career in the Premier League. This would be Hodgson's last game at Anfield.

In what would prove to be Hodgson's last ever game as Liverpool manager, his team were torn to shreds by a stunning performance from Blackburn. First half goals from Martin Olsson and a goal for Benjani set the tone for the rest of the evening. Things went from bad to worse for Liverpool after Benjani scored his second goal to make the score 3–0 after just 58 minutes. Liverpool were clearly shell shocked, but did manage to pull a goal back through Gerrard. Liverpool also got a penalty with only a few minutes to go, but Gerrard uncharacteristically skied the ball over the bar. Gerrard appeared to show little emotion after missing the penalty that would have got Liverpool back into the game, sparking rumours that he missed the spot kick on purpose to get Hodgson sacked.

On 8 January 2011, just one day before Liverpool were due to kick off their FA Cup campaign against Manchester United, the club announced Hodgson had left by mutual consent. Kenny Dalglish was due to take charge on a temporary basis until the end of the season. The news was welcomed by most Liverpool fans and the FA Cup game somewhat took lesser importance given Dalglish had not even had a days training with the squad he had inherited.

Liverpool lost their third round FA Cup game to Manchester United at Old Trafford thanks to an early penalty from Ryan Giggs; the spot kick was awarded after Dimitar Berbatov had gone over from a Daniel Agger challenge. Gerrard was to be sent off by referee Howard Webb in the first half after a reckless challenge, which would mean he would miss Liverpool's next three games (including the derby game against Everton at Anfield).

In Dalglish's first ever Premier League game in charge of Liverpool, his side lost to Blackpool 2–1, despite first taking the lead. Meireles finally scored his first goal for the club in the match, which ended 2–2. Anfield, however, was stunned after a Sylvain Distin goal from a corner in the first minute of the second half. Jermaine Beckford then put Everton in front with a well-placed finish. Liverpool won a penalty in the 68th minute which Dirk Kuyt duly slotted home. Despite the result, it was a definite improvement to performances under Hodgson.

In Liverpool's second league away game under Dalglish, they stormed past Wolves. Winning by a 3–0 margin, soon-to-depart Fernando Torres scored his last goals for the club. The first was from an excellent breakaway move which saw Meireles slip in the Spaniard who had an easy task to convert. It was Meireles who added a second on the day with a stunning volley that was later voted Goal of the Season by Liverpool fans. Torres rounded off the day – and his Liverpool career – by finishing a 31-pass move to give Dalglish his first win in charge of Liverpool. A few days later, Torres and Meireles helped out stressing John Paintsil into botching a clearance that resulted in Liverpool winning 1–0 at home to Fulham, this in spite of being struggling throughout the game. This meant the side moved into the top half of the table. On 31 January came Dalglish's first signings for the club since taking charge for the second time; Luis Suárez and Andy Carroll joined Liverpool for £22 million and a club record £35 million respectively. Torres left Liverpool for Chelsea for £50 million the same day, following a transfer request and a couple of intense days for the club as they had a bid turned down for Carroll before they sealed the transfer. Torres's move was regarded with contempt by Liverpool supporters, some of whom burned their replica "Torres #9" shirts on live television (Sky Sports News).

February
Following the sale of Torres and the arrivals of Carroll and Suárez (none fit enough to start from the beginning), Liverpool seemed to have a much thinner squad than at the start of the season. Carroll was unavailable for another month, while Suárez had been suspended due to biting Otman Bakkal in the ear in Eredivisie and therefore lacked match fitness. In the home game against Stoke, it was therefore primarily left to Gerrard and Meireles to earn the victory. Gerrard's free kick hit the wall and bounced favourably for Meireles, who tucked in a close-range shot to ensure Liverpool took the lead. Suárez was then substituted onto the pitch, and from a Dirk Kuyt throughball was alone with the goalkeeper, rounded him and tried to place a shot into the corner. A Stoke defender tried to clear in vain, and Suárez therefore became the first Liverpool player since his predecessor Torres to score on his Anfield debut.

The coming weekend Liverpool travelled to London to face Chelsea, with Torres making his debut against his former club. He received an elbow check from Daniel Agger and was denied a shot at goal when Jamie Carragher threw himself in his path. Being largely invisible in the second half, he was substituted, only to see Meireles tuck away one of only two chances for Liverpool the entire match, which won the game for the side. In the first half, Maxi Rodríguez had missed an open goal, whereas Chelsea struggled to create any significant chances at all on Liverpool's compact five-men defensive line, in which Glen Johnson had been moved to left back due to Fábio Aurélio's injury. Right back Martin Kelly impressed in his role.

Late February saw three unsuccessful clashes for Liverpool as the resurgence was halted. Following Meireles' goal against Wigan at Anfield and a compact advantage in play, few had expected defender Steve Gohouri to equalise for Wigan, after Liverpool's performance decreased in the second half. Suárez came close to a dream full debut as he smashed a free kick against the bar. Next Thursday, Liverpool travelled to the Czech Republic to face Sparta Prague. A dull encounter ended 0–0 with barely any chances created. The slump continued as relegation-bound West Ham beat Liverpool 3–1 at Upton Park on 28 February. This included a spectacular and rare strike from Hammer's figurehead Scott Parker, while Demba Ba and Carlton Cole also found the net against a five-defender line that looked out of place the entire game. Suárez was again on the prowl for Liverpool as he assisted Glen Johnson for the late consolation goal.

With Suárez being cup-tied for the Europa League, Liverpool had to make do without him in the return leg against Sparta Prague at Anfield. The visitors came close to having a shock away goal to knock Liverpool out, before Dirk Kuyt reacted the fastest on a late corner to head Liverpool into the last 16.

March
Liverpool were defeated by Braga in Portugal after Sotirios Kyrgiakos made a clumsy challenge that resulted in a spot-kick which Alan converted. Manchester United then came to Liverpool in search of three points to effectively put themselves out of bounds in the title chase against Arsenal. Liverpool donned a 4–3–3 formation with Kuyt and Suárez interchanging positions between right and centre and Maxi Rodríguez to the left. The trio's mobility put large holes to display in United's defence, with a stunning solo raid from Suárez enabling Kuyt to nick an open goal on about 20 minutes time. Following Dimitar Berbatov's hitting of the post for United in the opening ten minutes, that turned the play up on its head, and when Nani tried to clear a Suárez cross, only to hit the path of Kuyt, Liverpool went 2–0 up. In the second half, Suárez fired a free kick that Edwin van der Sar was powerless to keep in his hands, and Kuyt pounced on the rebound to make it a hat-trick and sealing the win for Liverpool. The game also saw a horrific challenge from Jamie Carragher on Nani, resulting in the latter being carried of the pitch on a stretcher with Carragher surprisingly escaping a red card for the late challenge. A challenge from Fábio on a Liverpool player a minute later in response nearly started a brawl on-pitch. As it was, the second half was a much less heated affair, and even though Javier Hernández scored a late consolation goal for United, Liverpool's win was never in doubt.

The return leg against Braga saw Andy Carroll get a big chance to equalise on aggregate, but his header hit the bar and Liverpool went out in the last 16. This was the first time since 2006 that Liverpool fans had no European quarter-final to look forward too, and the elimination was considered a disappointment.

With Suárez back in the starting XI away from home to Sunderland, the side won 2–0. Gerrard was out for the season with a hamstring injury, which saw Jay Spearing receiving long-awaited first team action. Spearing was brought down on the edge of the box and the referee decided it was committed inside the area. Kuyt converted the spot kick to send Liverpool ahead, and Suárez clinched the victory with a hard shot from a tight angle that goalkeeper Simon Mignolet could not save.

Players

First Team

Players' age as of 31 May 2011 (end of season)

Squad statistics

Appearances and goals
Last updated on 13 November 2012.

|-
|colspan="14"|Players sold or loaned out after the start of the season:

|}

Top scorers
Includes all competitive matches. The list is sorted by shirt number when total goals are equal.

Last updated on 9 May 2011

Disciplinary record
Updated 08/05/11

.

Team kit
The home strip for the 2010–11 season was revealed on 8 April 2010 bearing the Standard Chartered logo. The Adidas strip represents a modern interpretation of the one worn during the 1989–90 campaign in which Liverpool won their eighteenth league title. The away strip was revealed on 8 June and is white with a red trim, with black shorts accompanying it. The third kit was revealed on 15 June and is black with a yellow trim.

Transfers

In
First Team

Reserves and Academy

Total spending:  £82,800,000

Out
First Team

Reserves and Academy

Total income:  £87,150,000

Loaned in

Loaned out

Totals

Competitions

Overall

League table

Results by round

Results summary

Games against the top six

Big Four games

Premier League

UEFA Europa League

Qualifying

Third Qualifying Round

Play-off Round

Group stage

Knockout rounds

Round of 32

Round of 16

FA Cup

League Cup

Pre-season

Other

Jamie Carragher Testimonial

Reserves
Updated 12 May 2011. Squad Numbers refer to players' first team squad number (for season 2010/11), where applicable. Reserve and youth games are 1–11.

Academy (Under-18s)
The following players played for the team during the Premier Academy League 2010–11 Ages are as of July, 2010.
Updated 14 January 2011.

Notes

References

External links
2010–11 Liverpool F.C. season at Official Site
2010–11 Liverpool F.C. season at ESPN 
2010–11 Liverpool F.C. season at LFCHistory 

2010-11
2010–11 Premier League by team
2010–11 UEFA Europa League participants seasons